Sunda may refer to:

Europe 
 Sunda, Faroe Islands

India 
 Sunda (asura), an asura brother of Upasunda
 Sunda (clan), a clan (gotra) of Jats in Haryana and Rajasthan, India

Southeast Asia 
 Sundanese (disambiguation)
 Sundanese people
 Sundanese language
 Sundanese script
 Sundanese (Unicode block)
 Sunda Kingdom, a kingdom that existed in west part of Java island from the 7th century to the 16th century
 Kidung Sunda, a literary work that recounts the story of the "Battle of Bubat" between Sundanese and Javanese
Sunda Kelapa, is the old port of Jakarta located on the estuarine of Ciliwung River, the main port of the Sunda Kingdom
 Mount Sunda, an ancient extinct supervolcano once exist in Priangan highland during Pleistocene age, the predecessor of Tangkuban Perahu, Burangrang, and Bukit Tunggul volcanoes
 Sunda Strait, the strait between Java and Sumatra
 Sunda Islands, a group of islands located in Indonesia and Malaysia
 Greater Sunda Islands
 Lesser Sunda Islands
 Sunda Shelf, part of the continental shelf of Southeast Asia, covered by the South China Sea which isolates islands such as Borneo, Sumatra and Java
 Sunda Trench, is an oceanic trench located in the Indian Ocean near Sumatra, formed where the Australian-Capricorn plates subduct under a part of the Eurasian Plate.
 Sunda Arc, volcanic arc that produced the volcanoes that form the topographic spine of the islands of Sumatra, Nusa Tenggara, and Java, the Sunda Strait and the Lesser Sunda Islands. 
 Sundaland, a biogeographical region that comprises the Malay Peninsula and the Indonesian Archipelago islands west of the Wallace Line

Language and nationality disambiguation pages

ca:Sonda